Branksome railway station serves the Branksome and Branksome Park areas of Poole in Dorset, England.

History

The London and South Western Railway (LSWR) opened its line from Bournemouth to Poole in 1874, but the station was not opened until 1893. The S&DJR opened a locomotive depot at the station in 1895 which operated until closure of the line into Bournemouth West in 1965, after which the S&D trains ran, for the remaining few months of operation, into Bournemouth Central railway station, which had its own locomotive shed.

The line between Bournemouth Central to Branksome and Bournemouth Traction and Rolling Stock Maintenance Depot was electrified in 1967 to enable stock to access Bournemouth Depot.

Accommodation
The station is able to accommodate trains of up to five coaches; longer trains only open the doors in the first four or five coaches depending on the type of unit operating the service.

To the east of the station is the junction leading to Bournemouth Train Care Depot, built on part of the site of Bournemouth West carriage sidings.  Trains can often be seen arriving on platform 2 and then reversing into the depot.

Services
The station is served by South Western Railway.

The typical off-peak stopping pattern of this station, as of June 2021, is below:
 1 train per hour on Monday-Friday on Poole-London Waterloo express service.
 2 trains per hour on Saturday, 1 on Weymouth-London Waterloo express service, and 1 on Poole-Winchester stopping service.
 1 train per hour on Sunday on Weymouth-London Waterloo express service.

External links

SDJR.net Junctions and Pottery Siding

Railway stations in Poole
Railway stations in Great Britain opened in 1893
Former London and South Western Railway stations
Railway stations served by South Western Railway
DfT Category E stations